"U Remind Me" is a song by American singer Usher. It was written by Edmund "Eddie Hustle" Clement and Anita McCloud and produced by Clement for Usher's third studio album 8701 (2001). A mid-tempo R&B track, the song is about a man who meets a woman who seems like a nice catch, but he decides not to enter a relationship with her because she looks too much like an ex-girlfriend with whom he had a bad breakup.

The song served as the lead American single from 8701 following the release of previous single "Pop Ya Collar", which was only included in some editions of the album. "U Remind Me" topped the US Billboard Hot 100 on July 7, 2001, and also reached the top five in Australia, Belgium, France, the Netherlands, New Zealand, and the United Kingdom. The song won Usher his first Grammy Award for Best Male R&B Vocal Performance in 2002. Its accompanying music video features Chilli of TLC as one of the female leads.

Composition
"U Remind Me" is a contemporary R&B song written in the key of G major, and is set in common time with a moderate tempo of 92 beats per minute. The song follows the chord progression of Em7-Am7-Bm7, and the piano ranges from the low note of E2 to the high note of A5, while Usher's vocal range stretches from B2 to A5.

The song's lyrics are based on meeting a woman who reminds Usher of an ex-girlfriend, and therefore cannot date her.

Critical reception
James Poletti of Yahoo! Music noted the song as the best track on 8701, dubbing it the 2001 version of Craig David's "Fill Me In". Allmusic's Stephen Thomas Erlewine also chose it as a highlight from the album. In 2010, Boonsri Dickinson of AOL Radio ranked "U Remind Me" as Usher's ninth-best song. In 2016, Complex ranked the song number six on their list of the 25 greatest Usher songs, and in 2021, American Songwriter ranked the song number seven on their list of the 10 greatest Usher songs.

"U Remind Me" gained Usher his first Grammy Award, winning the category of Best Male R&B Vocal Performance at the 44th annual ceremony. Other nominees for the award were Case's "Missing You", Maxwell's "Lifetime", Brian McKnight's "Love of My Life" and Musiq Soulchild's "Love".

Music video
The accompanying music video for the song was directed by Dave Meyers. The video features look-a-likes for singers Mýa, Brandy, and Tamia, while featuring the real Chilli of TLC at the end to show the theme of the women reminding him of his past relationships. The video was filmed in April 2001.

Track listings

US CD single
 "U Remind Me" (radio edit) – 3:50
 "U Remind Me" (instrumental) – 4:26
 Snippets from 8701

US 12-inch single 1
A1. "U Remind Me" (Illicit club mix) – 7:27
A2. "U Remind Me" (Illicit acappella) – 4:44
B1. "U Remind Me" (Pete & Vincent's club mix) – 6:44
B2. "U Remind Me" (Pete & Vincent's dub mix) – 5:27

US 12-inch single 2
A1. "U Remind Me" (remix featuring Method Man and Blu Cantrell—radio mix) – 3:56
A2. "U Remind Me" (album version) – 4:27
B1. "U Remind Me" (club mix) – 3:55
B2. "U Remind Me" (instrumental) – 3:56
B3. "U Remind Me" (club mix acappella) – 3:39

European CD single and UK cassette single
 "U Remind Me" (radio edit) – 4:27
 "I Don't Know" (featuring P. Diddy) – 4:27

UK CD single
 "U Remind Me" (radio edit) – 4:27
 "I Don't Know" (featuring P. Diddy) – 4:27
 "TTP" – 3:38
 "U Remind Me" (video)

UK 12-inch single
 "U Remind Me" (radio edit) – 4:27
 "I Don't Know" (featuring P. Diddy) – 4:27
 "TTP" – 3:38

Australian CD single
 "U Remind Me" (radio edit) – 4:27
 "U Remind Me" (istrumental) – 4:26
 "I Don't Know" (featuring P. Diddy) – 4:27
 "TTP" – 3:38

Credits and personnel
Credits are lifted from the European CD single liner notes.

Studio
 Recorded at Tree Sound Studios (Norcross, Georgia, US)

Personnel

 Anita McCloud – writing
 Edmund "Eddie Hustle" Clement – writing (as Edmund Clement), production
 Usher – vocals
 Jimmy Jam & Terry Lewis – production
 John Frye – recording
 Mark Rains – recording, Pro Tools
 Warren Bletcher – recording assistant
 Brad Todd – recording assistant
 Kevin "KD" Davis – mixing
 Steve Baughman – mixing assistant
 Gravillis Inc. – art direction
 DL Warfield – art direction
 Courtney Walter – artwork design
 Christian Lantry – photography
 Eric Archibald – styling

Charts

Weekly charts

Year-end charts

Decade-end charts

Certifications

Release history

See also
 List of Hot 100 number-one singles of 2001 (U.S.)
 R&B number-one hits of 2001 (USA)

References

2001 singles
2001 songs
Arista Records singles
Bertelsmann Music Group singles
Billboard Hot 100 number-one singles
Music videos directed by Dave Meyers (director)
Usher (musician) songs